The Keith Building is a skyscraper in downtown Cleveland, Ohio's Playhouse Square theater district. The Keith is 272 feet tall and 21 stories, and houses the Palace Theater, a former flagship theater of the Keith vaudeville circuit. As of 2017, the renovated building is in use as an office tower.

At the time of its construction in 1922, the Keith was the tallest building in Cleveland, and currently stands as the 25th-tallest. It is also the tallest performing arts-related building in Ohio. From 1922 through the mid-1950s, the Keith also had a multi-story electric sign on its roof, claimed to be the largest electric sign in the world at the time of its construction.

History
Owner Edward Albee II named it in memory of B. F. Keith, his former business partner and one of the most important vaudeville theatre circuit owners in the history of American theater. The Palace Theater housed in the Keith Building is Playhouse Square Center's second-largest theater (in seating capacity), which was the flagship for the Keith vaudeville circuit. The Keith was added to the National Register of Historic Places in 1978 as the Playhouse Square Group consortium. This in part spurred the city of Cleveland to donate $3.15 million in economic work grants to spear head the starting of the renovation of Playhouse Square as it is known today.
 
In 1980, the firm of Barber & Hoffman, a consulting in engineering company began to identify several structural problems with the then over 55-year-old building and by 2000 had completed a 3 million dollar restoration of the facade and several cosmetic issues. In early 2015, the K & D Group entered into an agreement to purchase the Keith for what was reported to be 6.3 million dollars in February. However, unlike their other downtown properties, K&D indicated that it will remain an office building and not be converted to apartments any time in the near future. In March, it was announced that K&D did in fact purchase the building but for only 5.2 million instead of 6.3 million as reported in February 2015.

Legacy in community

In 2010, the Keith Building is credited with being one of the biggest donors in Cleveland Thermal's Cleveland Food Bank annual Harvest for Hunger food drive. The Palace Theater is known for presenting children's entertainment for school children in the Greater Cleveland area and for many of these children it is their first taste of professional theater.

See also
List of tallest buildings in Cleveland

References

External links

Commercial buildings completed in 1922
Skyscraper office buildings in Cleveland